Matilde Pérez Palacio Carranza (8 September 1913 – 16 August 1992) was a Peruvian educator, journalist and politician. In 1956 she was among the first group of women elected to Congress, serving until 1962, and again between 1963 and 1968.

Biography
She attended the Colegio Sagrados Corazones de Belén and earned a commercial accountancy diploma. She later attended the Catholic University, graduating in 1934 with a bachelor's degree in philosophy, history and letters.

She subsequently studied for a doctorate in history and geography, graduating in 1936, after which she worked as a professor of History and Geography at the Colegio de Belén. In 1939 she earned a Bachelor of Laws and qualified as a lawyer in 1941. The following year she became a doctor of pedagogy. From 1941 until 1970 she served as director of the Women's Institute of Higher Studies of the Catholic University, and in 1945 founded the university's School of Journalism, serving as its director until 1972, and was a correspondent for several national and overseas newspapers.

In 1956 Pérez was among the founders of Popular Action. She was a candidate in the 1956 Chamber of Deputies elections for the party and was one of first group of nine women elected to Congress. After entering parliament, she sat on the Press and Publications commission, the Social Assistance commission and the Women and Minors commission. Although she lost her seat in the 1962 elections, she returned to Congress following the 1963 elections, serving until the 1968 coup.

After leaving Congress she became a director of the Association of Journalists of Peru, the Human Rights Commission of the Lima Bar Association and a UNESCO representative, and was awarded the Order of the Sun of Peru. She died in 1992.

References

1913 births
People from Lima
Pontifical Catholic University of Peru alumni
Academic staff of the Pontifical Catholic University of Peru
Peruvian women journalists
20th-century Peruvian women politicians
20th-century Peruvian politicians
Popular Action (Peru) politicians
Members of the Chamber of Deputies of Peru
Recipients of the Order of the Sun of Peru
1992 deaths